Brealey is a surname. Notable people with the surname include:

Bruce Brealey (born 1959), British Army officer
Gil Brealey (born 1932), Australian television and film director, producer and writer
Louise Brealey (born 1979), English actress, writer and journalist
Richard A. Brealey, British economist and author

See also may refer to:

Brealeys is a village in Devon, England
Nicholas Brealey, an imprint of British publisher John Murray